Paige Braddock is an American cartoonist best known for her Eisner-nominated comic strip, Jane's World, the first gay-themed comic work to receive online distribution by a national media syndicate in the U.S. Braddock concluded the comic strip after completing its 20-year run in 2018.

Early life 
Braddock was born in Bakersfield, California. She spent most of her childhood years in Mississippi. Due to her father's job as a forester, Braddock and her family moved frequently across the country. By the time she reached high school in Brevard, North Carolina, they had moved 17 times.

Career 
Braddock decided at the age of 7 that she wanted to be a cartoonist. She published her first cartoon, "Bart Winkle," in her junior year of high school in the local newspaper, The Transylvania Times. Cartoonist Dave Graue of the comic strip "Alley Oop" lived in the area and served as her mentor.

Braddock earned a Bachelor of Fine Arts degree from the University of Tennessee in Knoxville in 1985. Early in her career she worked as an illustrator for several newspapers, including The Orlando Sentinel, The Chicago Tribune, and The Atlanta Constitution.

Braddock began crafting her long-standing comic, Jane's World, in 1991. In 2006, she received an Eisner Award nomination for best humor book for her work on the comic. Braddock published the first novel inspired by the comic series, Jane's World: The Case of the Mail Order Bride, in June 2016 with LGBTQ publisher Bold Strokes Books. An anthology spanning 20 years of the comic, Love Letters to Jane's World, was released by Lion Forge Comics in August 2018. In 2019 it was selected as a Lambda Literary finalist for best LGBTQ graphic novel. Installments of the comic strip can continue to be found at GoComics.

In 1999, Braddock became the Creative Director at Charles M. Schulz Creative Associates, Schulz's studio in Northern California. In 2018, Braddock assumed the position of Chief Creative Officer and in this role is charged with overseeing the visual and editorial direction for all Peanuts licensed products worldwide. The Schulz studio works in tandem with the licensing office in New York, Peanuts Worldwide. As a professional cartoonist, she has illustrated several Peanuts children's books. The Snoopy U.S. postage stamp issued in April 2001 was designed by Braddock. In 2022, she delivered the dedication of the commemorative centennial Schulz stamp at the issuance ceremony. She also won a Children's & Family Emmy Award for her work on the Apple documentary, "Who Are You, Charlie Brown?" which won for outstanding nonfiction program that same year.

Throughout Braddock's career as a cartoonist, she has published a diverse collection of comic works. In 2008, Braddock co-created the science fiction graphic novel series The Martian Confederacy with writer Jason McNamara. In 2015, she began publishing a line of graphic novels for children with Andrews McMeel Publishing. There are currently three books in the Stinky Cecil series. Braddock is publishing a line of graphic novels for children with Penguin Books for Kids titled, Peanut, Butter, & Crackers. The third book in the series, On the Trail is out now.

PB9 Comics/Girl Twirl Comics 
PB9 Comics serves as the hub for all of Paige Braddock's independent comics. In 2001, Braddock launched her own publishing company, Girl Twirl Comics, to make Jane's World available in comic shops and bookstores. In 2008, Girl Twirl Comics published Volume 1 of The Martian Confederacy graphic novel series. Volume 2 in the series was published in 2011.

As Missouri Vaun 
In 2015, Paige Braddock began writing lesbian romance novels with publisher Bold Strokes Books under the pen name, Missouri Vaun.

Vaun won two Golden Crown Literary Society awards in 2019. Love at Cooper's Creek won a contemporary romance award and Proxima Five won an award in the science-fiction category.

Personal life 
Braddock and her wife, Evelyn, live in Northern California.

Selected works
Jane's World
Love Letters to Jane's World, Lion Forge, 2018
Jane's World: The Case of the Mail Order Bride, Bold Strokes Books, 2016
Jane's World, Volume 11, Girl Twirl Comics, 2014
Jane's World, Volume 10, The New Frontier, Girl Twirl Comics, 2011
Jane's World, Volume 9, Girl Twirl Comics, 2009 
Jane's World, Volume 8, Girl Twirl Comics, 2008
Jane's World, Collection 1 (first 15 issues), Girl Twirl Comics, 2007
Jane's World, Volume 7, Girl Twirl Comics, 2007 
Jane's World, Volume 6, Girl Twirl Comics, 2006 
Jane's World, Volume 5, Girl Twirl Comics, 2006 
Jane's World, Volume 4, Girl Twirl Comics, 2006 
Jane's World, Volume 3, Girl Twirl Comics, 2005 
Jane's World, Volume 2, Girl Twirl Comics, 2004 
Jane's World, Volume 1, Girl Twirl Comics, 2003

Peanut, Butter, & Crackers
On the Trail, Penguin Kids, 2022
Fetch!, Penguin Kids, 2021
Puppy Problems, Penguin Kids, 2020

Stinky Cecil
Stinky Cecil in Mudslide Mayhem, Andrews McMeel Publishing, 2018
Stinky Cecil in Terrarium Terror, Andrews McMeel Publishing, 2016
Stinky Cecil in Operation Pond Rescue, Andrews McMeel Publishing, 2015

The Martian Confederacy
The Martian Confederacy, Volume 2, with Jason McNamara, Girl Twirl Comics, 2011
The Martian Confederacy, Volume 1, with Jason McNamara, Girl Twirl Comics, 2008

Anthology Contributions by Paige Braddock
Femme Magnifique: 50 Magnificent Women Who Changed the World, by Shelly Bond, IDW, 2018
Love is Love, by Marc Andreyko, IDW, DC Entertainment, 2017

Author Contributions by Paige Braddock
Posie the Pika: Mallory Spreads Her Wings, art by Blythe Russo, Epic, 2022
Posie the Pika, art by Blythe Russo, Epic, 2022

Missouri Vaun 
Slow Burn, Bold Strokes Books, 2022
The Mandolin Lunch, Bold Strokes Books, 2020
The Sea Within, Bold Strokes Books, 2020
Chasing Sunset, Bold Strokes Books, 2019
Spencer's Cove, Bold Strokes Books, 2019
Proxima Five, Bold Strokes Books, 2018
Take My Hand, Bold Strokes Books, 2018
 Love at Cooper's Creek, Bold Strokes Books, 2018
 Crossing the Wide Forever, Bold Strokes Books, 2017
 Birthright, Bold Strokes Books, 2017
 Privacy Glass, Bold Strokes Books, 2017
 Smothered and Covered, Bold Strokes Books, 2017
 One More Reason to Leave Orlando, Bold Strokes Books, 2016
 Death By Cocktail Straw, Bold Strokes Books, 2016
 Valley of Fire, Bold Strokes Books, 2016
Whiskey Sunrise, Bold Strokes Books, 2016
All Things Rise, Bold Strokes Books, 2015
The Ground Beneath, Bold Strokes Books, 2015
The Time Before Now, Bold Strokes Books, 2015

Anthology Contributions by Missouri Vaun
 The Lonely Hearts Rescue, with Nell Stark and Morgan Lee Miller, Bold Strokes Books, 2022
 Girls Next Door, by Sandy Lowe and Stacia Seaman, Bold Strokes Books, 2017
 Absolute Power: Tales of Queer Villainy!, by Erica Friedman, Northwest Press, 2016

See also
 List of female comics creators
 List of feminist comic books

References

Further reading 
Why We Love Graphic Novels, by Paige Braddock, Teen Librarian Toolbox at School Library Journal, July 12, 2022
'You Could Stand Up a Little Taller': An Interview with Paige Braddock, by Alex Dueben, The Comics Journal, May 21, 2019
'Love Letters to Jane's World' by Paige Braddock, by Tara Scott, Lambda Literary, November 14, 2018
"'Jane's World' Goes Out With a Marriage", by George Gene Gustines, The New York Times, October 19, 2018
"Paige Braddock Shares Love Letters to Jane's World in Unique Retrospective,"" by Chris Arrant, Newsarama, August 3, 2018
"Get an Inside Look at the Making of the Peanuts," video by Threadless, February 23, 2015.
"Stinky Cecil in Operation Pond Rescue Review" , by Brian Cronin, Comic Book Resources, February 6, 2015.
"Review: Stinky Cecil in Operation Pond Rescue", by Esther Keller, School Library Journal, January 15, 2015.
"Gallery of Geek: Paige Braddock", by Brian Andersen, The Advocate, September 11, 2014. 
"San Diego COMIC-CON 2013: Paige Braddock on the power of 'Peanuts' – and LGBTQ storytelling in 2013", by Michael Cavna, Washington Post, July 19, 2013.
"Women in Comics – Paige Braddock," Girls Read Comics Too, January 21, 2012.
"10 years in 'Jane's World': An interview with Paige Braddock", AfterEllen.com, December 21, 2011.
"Paige Braddock's 'Jane's World'", video by The Press Democrat, April 12, 2009.

External links 

Jane's World
Jane's World at GoComics
Peanut, Butter, & Crackers
Stinky Cecil
Missouri Vaun

1963 births
Living people
20th-century American artists
21st-century American artists
Alternative cartoonists
American comic strip cartoonists
American female comics artists
Female comics writers
Feminist artists
Lesbian feminists
LGBT comics creators
American LGBT writers
LGBT people from California
People from Bakersfield, California
People from Brevard, North Carolina
University of Tennessee alumni
American lesbian artists